The Battle of Morlaix was a battle fought in Morlaix on 30 September 1342 between the Anglo-Breton and Franco-Breton forces in Brittany. The Anglo-Breton under English command besieged the town, but a Franco-Breton relief force arrived. The English constructed a strong defensive position. After repeated attacks, the French forced the English to retreat into the woods, and the French force then withdrew.

The War of Breton Succession

Context
In 1341 John III, Duke of Brittany died without leaving an heir. The question of the succession ignited a civil war in sovereign duchy of Brittany which lasted about 25 years initially between John's half brother, John of Montfort and his niece Joan, Duchess of Brittany, wife of Charles of Blois.  Charles and Joan had the support of the Breton nobility and clergy while John was an outsider whose main concentration of power was in the Île de France. However, Charles was also the nephew of Philip VI of France who backed Joan's claim and brought outside interference, while England supported John de Montfort's claim.

Relieving the Siege of Brest
Initially, Edward III of England could do little to help the de Montforts, he had his own problems at home, but eventually he felt able to send a small force under Sir Walter Mauny to aid them. As a result of Mauny's initial successes, Edward decided to send a larger force of knights and archers under the command of William de Bohun, 1st Earl of Northampton. For a long time its departure was delayed and by the time they arrived in Brittany, John de Montfort was a prisoner of the Franco-Bretons and the struggle was being carried on by his wife Jeanne de Montfort. When Northampton landed on 18 August 1342, the Countess, her men and the remnants of Mauny's force were besieged at Brest by a large Franco-Breton army under the command of Charles of Blois and a force of Genoese ships. On Northampton's arrival the Franco-Bretons appear to have fled without bothering to engage the smaller English force and the siege of Brest was relieved.

English Relief Force Moves inland
From Brest, Northampton moved inland and there are few details of what happened during this journey but eventually he reached Morlaix, one of Charles de Blois’ strongholds.

English Siege of Morlaix
His initial attack on the town was unsuccessful and having been repulsed with slight losses he then settled into a siege.

Since Charles de Blois' forces had withdrawn from the siege in Brest, they had been growing in numbers possibly reaching as many as 15,000. Informed that Northampton's force was considerably smaller than his own Charles began to advance on Morlaix intending to lift Northampton's siege. On receiving intelligence of de Blois’ advance Northampton, not wishing to be trapped between de Blois’ force and sorties from the garrison of Morlaix, made a night march to intercept him.

Only three chroniclers give any account of the battle and they are all English: Geoffrey le Baker, Adam Murimuth and Henry Knighton. This absence of contemporary interest is possibly because the battle was indecisive and also because Brittany was somewhat of a backwater removed from the main action of the courts and armies of Edward III and Philip VI. None of the chroniclers give much detail of the battle and little of the battle orders of the two sides beyond stating that the Franco-Bretons were deployed into 3 lines. At least one of the Franco-Breton divisions was solely of mounted knights led by Geoffroi de Charny. Adam de Murimuth puts the total Franco-Breton numbers at 3000 cavalry, 1500 Janissaries by which he may mean Genoese and a mixed force of Breton infantry. The bulk of the Bretons were probably quite an ineffective force, just local levies. The English numbers are also unclear. Northampton had less than 1,500 on his arrival at Brest. He had been reinforced by Robert of Artois with another 800 and an unknown number of Bretons of unknown quality. He would have had to leave some behind to contain the Morlaix garrison so almost certainly his numbers would have been less than the Franco-Bretons but all the figures are all from English sources and thus, for the French, probably an overestimation.

Modern interpretations of the battle

Burne
A.H. Burne, attributes huge numbers to the Franco-Bretons, maintaining that each of the Franco-Bretons divisions outnumbered the whole English army.

According to Burne's reconstruction, the infantry column attacked first and was sent reeling back by volleys of arrows before it even contacted the English line of dismounted knights. After a consultation between the commanders the second column of cavalry attacked and many were brought down by falling into the pits that had been dug by the English. Some did manage to penetrate the English line but these, including Geoffrey de Charny, were captured by the Breton infantry held in reserve. The last French cavalry column after seeing the defeat of the first two divisions hesitated to attack but because the English archers were now short of arrows Northampton withdrew into the woods at his back and formed a ‘hedgehog’. Here he was safe from a cavalry charge and though the last French column did attack everywhere it was driven back.

Sumption
Jonathan Sumption gives an alternative description of the battle which, while not contradicting Burne's battle order for the English, depicts the actions of the French nobility in a way that is far more in line with other battles of the 100 Years War.

According to Sumption, the first attack was mounted not by the infantry but by Franco-Breton cavalry under the command of Geoffrey de Charny. These reached the English positions but were thrown back in disarray and de Charny himself captured.

After this setback the second line of cavalry attacked but now fell into the pit traps.

Finally Sumption then goes on to say that almost no use was made of the French infantry who never left their starting positions.

DeVries
Kelly DeVries 'Infantry Warfare in the Early 14th. Century' seems to follow the existing chronicle sources more closely than the Burne and Sumption and he gives a different account of the deployment of the English army. He maintains that the archers were intermingled with the men-at-arms because the knights were so few and also that the archers were given other weapons than their longbows which seems to imply that the English used no archery at all.

Like Sumption he maintains that the first line of cavalry attacked under the command of Geoffrey de Charny but were immediately put to flight. There is some confusion in DeVries account because the map he has drawn of the battlefield shows pits and ditches dug all around the English but nowhere does it say the first French attack fell into the pits but if the pits were all around how could they not fall into them? Like Burne, after the first failure he has the French leaders holding a conference amongst themselves in order to decide what to do next but eventually, as the French still outnumbered the English, another attack was mounted. From the sources he says it was unclear whether it was just a cavalry attack or a joint cavalry/infantry attack. Now his account becomes even more confusing because he says that the second line actually hit the English but were pushed back into the pits and ditches but does not explain how this was possible. He quotes Henry Knighton as saying that the French were drawn into a narrow cave and they fell on top of each other into the pits the English had dug.

Ayton & Preston
According to Ayton & Preston, there is no detailed exposition of how the English were deployed except that they had taken position in front of a wood and that all were dismounted even the knights and that before the French arrived on the scene they had prepared the ground in front of them by digging pits and ditches and covering them with hay and grass.

Outcome of the battle
Whatever the details of the fighting, the final result was that 50 French knights were killed and 150 French captured including Geoffrey de Charny and a number of ‘populari’ which seems to indicate that at least some of the infantry were involved in the melee.

The English force now made apprehensive by the remaining French forces withdrew into the wood at their back where they were safe from a full blooded cavalry charge. What was left of de Blois’ force then evidently relieved Morlaix and the besieging English, now trapped in the wood, themselves became the object of a siege for several days.

References

Sources
 Sumption, Jonathan   ‘The Hundred Years War  Volume 1 Trial by Battle’ Faber  1992
 Burne, Lt. Col. Alfred H. ‘The Crécy War’  Greenhill  1990
 DeVriess, Kelly  ‘Infantry Warfare in the Early 14th. Century’  Boydell 1996
 Ayton, A & Preston P  ‘ The Battle of Crécy 1346’  Boydell  2005

Battles involving France
Battles of the Hundred Years' War
Conflicts in 1342
1342 in England
1340s in France
Military history of Brittany
War of the Breton Succession
History of Finistère